Otávio Henrique Passos Santos (born 4 May 1994), simply known as Otávio, is a Brazilian professional footballer who plays as a defensive midfielder for Campeonato Brasileiro Série A club Atlético Mineiro.

Club career

Atlético Paranaense
Born in Maceió, Alagoas, Otávio joined Atlético Paranaense's youth setup in 2009, aged 14, after starting it out at CRB. He was promoted to the main squad in 2014, and appeared in all matches of the year's Campeonato Paranaense.

Otávio made his Série A debut on 20 April 2014, coming on as a late substitute in a 1–0 home win against Grêmio. He scored his first goal in the category on 12 June 2016, netting the equalizer in a 2–1 away win against São Paulo.

Bordeaux
On 8 August 2017, Otávio signed for Ligue 1 side Bordeaux from Athletico Paranaense for a €5.2 million transfer fee. He was given the number 5 shirt by the club. He played a total of 29 matches in his first season.

Atlético Mineiro 
On 4 February 2022, Otávio joined Atlético Mineiro on loan until 30 June, with an agreement to make the deal permanent at the end of the loan. He signed a four-year contract with the club.

Career statistics

Honours
Atlético Paranaense
Campeonato Paranaense: 2016

Atlético Mineiro
Supercopa do Brasil: 2022
Campeonato Mineiro: 2022

References

External links
Atlético Paranaense profile 

1994 births
Living people
People from Maceió
Brazilian footballers
Brazilian expatriate footballers
Association football midfielders
Campeonato Brasileiro Série A players
Ligue 1 players
Club Athletico Paranaense players
FC Girondins de Bordeaux players
Clube Atlético Mineiro players
Expatriate footballers in France
Brazilian expatriate sportspeople in France
Sportspeople from Alagoas